Bakhsh Ali is a village in Ardabil Province, Iran.

References

Tageo

Populated places in Ardabil Province